The Männlichen is a  mountain in the Swiss Alps located within the Canton of Berne.

It can be reached from Wengen by the Wengen–Männlichen aerial cableway, or from the new (December 2019) Grindelwald Terminal station using the Grindelwald–Männlichen gondola cableway (GM).  It then takes 15 minutes to walk to the summit. It is a popular viewpoint over the Lauterbrunnen valley and a popular start location for hikers and skiers.

See also
List of mountains of Switzerland accessible by public transport

References

External links
Männlichen on Hikr

Bernese Oberland
Mountains of the Alps
Mountains of Switzerland
Cable cars in Switzerland
Tourist attractions in the Canton of Bern
Mountains of the canton of Bern
Two-thousanders of Switzerland